Mantidactylus majori is a species of frog in the family Mantellidae. It is endemic to Madagascar. Its natural habitats are subtropical or tropical moist lowland forests, subtropical or tropical moist montane forests, rivers, and swamps. It is threatened by habitat loss.

References

majori
Endemic frogs of Madagascar
Taxonomy articles created by Polbot
Amphibians described in 1896